John Gill Holland, Jr. (born November 7, 1964) is an American film producer and co-developer of The Green Building in Louisville, Kentucky.

Early life and education
Born in Chapel Hill, North Carolina, Holland was raised in Davidson, North Carolina. Holland's father was born in Lynch, Kentucky and grew up in Lynchburg, Virginia. His mother was born in Norway. An Eagle Scout, Holland graduated from The Episcopal High School (Alexandria, VA) in 1983 and went on to be a Morehead Scholar and graduated from the University of North Carolina (B. A. 1987) (J.D. 1991). He spent his junior year at Universite Paul Valery in Montpellier, France and one semester of law school with Pace University at University College, London, England.

Career

Film production 
Holland owns The Group Entertainment LLC, which includes a film production company, talent management division, a music company and an art gallery, The Green Building Gallery. In the past, The Group Entertainment also included a talent management company. Holland has produced more than 100 feature films including Hurricane Streets which was the first film ever to win three Sundance Film Festival awards in 1997 as well as the Cannes Film Festival selection Inside/Out, the Independent Spirit Awards winner Sweet Land and nominee Dear Jesse (also nominated for an Emmy), the Gotham Awards nominee Spring Forward, FLOW: For Love of Water which was short-listed for an Academy Award, and 2017 SXSW winners The Seer (re-titled Look and See: A Portrait of Wendell Berry) and Most Beautiful Island. He has served on many film festival panels and juries, including 1999 Sundance Film Festival short film jury, Norwegian International Film Festival for the Amanda Awards and the Academy Awards, Student Division (2002 and 2003).

Holland founded cineBLAST!, which The Hollywood Reporter in 1999 and 2000 called one of the top ten production companies in New York City. He was an editor before he sold cineBLAST! in 2000 at the height of the tech boom. Before that he worked for three years at the French Film Office / Unifrance after a brief stint at October Films.

Holland is also the founder of sonaBLAST! Records, an independent record label featuring Ben Sollee, Nerves Junior, Kyle James Hauser, Cheyenne Marie Mize, The Old Ceremony, and Irish singer-songwriter Mark Geary, whose 2004 release Ghosts featuring backing vocals by Josh Ritter and Glen Hansard is nearing gold status and received critical acclaim in Ireland and the USA. He has also worked with Jack Harlow on his first EP, whose single "What's Poppin" went to the number two spot on the Billboard Charts. The company moved with Holland to Louisville in 2006.

Louisville developer 
Together with his wife, Augusta Brown Holland, Holland developed The Green Building. This renovation of a historic building opened in the Fall of 2008 in the area that he dubbed "NuLu" for the East Market District. It used to provide offices for sonaBLAST! Records, Holland Brown Books and The Group Entertainment. They then went on to landmark and develop almost a block of neighboring historic buildings. He is the author of two fund-raising art books for children, "Louisville Counts" and "L is for Louisville." Louisville Magazine named Gill its 2009 Person of the Year.

He has been dubbed the "Mayor of NuLu", by Louisville magazine NFocus, after all of his efforts in the East Market District, where he has also been president of NuLu Business Association for the past 4 years. In 2013, he turned his attention to the historic Portland neighborhood in West Louisville and is and working on rehabilitating historic shotgun houses, in addition to developing several mixed-use spaces. Past and present board and commission service includes Actors Theatre of Louisville, Louisville Film Society, Fund for the Arts, Speed Art Museum, Olmsted Parks Conservancy, Louisville Public Media, Kentucky Film Commission, KY Governor's School for the Arts Advisory Council, International Bluegrass Music Museum, the Americana Center, and the Muhammad Ali Center. Holland is a minority owner of the Forecastle Festival and Louisville City FC and famed music recording studio, LaLaLand Studios.

Politics 
Holland ran unsuccessfully for Louisville Metro Council in 2016. In 2016 and 2017, Holland was voted "Best Entrepreneur" in Louisville's "LeoWeekly" Readers’ Choice Awards. Most recently, Louisville Business First honored him with the 2017 Excellence in Leadership award for his successful NuLu redevelopment and current efforts in the Portland neighborhood.

Holland unsuccessfully ran for Lieutenant Governor of Kentucky with running mate Adam Edelen in the 2019 Kentucky gubernatorial election.

Selected filmography

 Most Beautiful Island (2017)
 Look & See: A Portrait of Wendell Berry (2016)
 Omphalos  (2016)
 An Honest Liar (2014)
 MaidenTrip (2014)
 Big Star: Nothing Can Hurt Me (2012)
 Mariachi Gringo (2011)
 The Catechism Cataclysm (2011)
 Bass Ackwards (2010)
 Beautiful Darling (2009)
 The War Boys (2009)
 David & Layla (2008)
 FLOW: For Love of Water (2008)
 Adventures of Power (2008)
 Asylum Seekers (2008)
 Were the World Mine (2008)
 Mountaintop Removal (2007)
 Just Like the Son (2006)
 Mentor (2006)
 Sweet Land (2005)
 Nicky's Game (2005)
 Loggerheads (2005)
 Dot the I (2003)
 Martin & Orloff (2002)
 Spring Forward (1999)
 Dear Jesse (1998)
 Desert Blue (1998)
 Hurricane Streets (1997)
 Inside/Out'' (1997)

References

External links

Voice-Tribune article on NuLu by Holland
Gill Holland on the Business of Filmmaking
Performance on The Moth mentioning Holland
Gill Holland on MetroTV "Leadership Landscape"
Gill Holland's Portland Efforts on WDRB
Gill Holland on Citylab.com
Investors Bet on Portland Neighborhood's Revival

1964 births
American film producers
American music industry executives
Living people
American people of Norwegian descent
People from Chapel Hill, North Carolina
People from Davidson, North Carolina